The Ludwig and Christina Welk Homestead built in 1893 is an historic farm house located at 845 88th Street,  South East in Strasburg, North Dakota. It is also known as the Lawrence Welk Birthplace, the Mike Welk Farm and ND SITS 32 EM 46. Here on March 11, 1903, noted American musician, accordionist, bandleader, and television impresario Lawrence Welk was born to Ludwig and Christina Welk, who were German-speaking Roman Catholics from Alsace-Lorraine by way of Odessa, Ukraine (then part of the Russian Empire). On October 28, 1993, the homestead was added to the National Register of Historic Places.

The Lawrence Welk Birthplace, officially called the Ludwig and Christina Welk Farmstead, has been restored and is run by local volunteers including Lawrence Welk's niece Edna Schwab. Although Welk donated to other local efforts, surprisingly he specified that none of his money be used for the restoration of his birthplace.

References

External links
Information and photos
North Dakota tourism information

Biographical museums in North Dakota
Farms on the National Register of Historic Places in North Dakota
German-Russian culture in North Dakota
Historic house museums in North Dakota
Houses completed in 1893
Lawrence Welk
Museums in Emmons County, North Dakota
Ukrainian-American culture in North Dakota
National Register of Historic Places in Emmons County, North Dakota
1893 establishments in North Dakota